Manitou Springs School District 14 is the main school district of Manitou Springs and its nearby communities (Cascade, Cedar Heights, Chipita Park, and Green Mountain Falls) at the western edge of El Paso County, Colorado.

The district currently serves around 1400 students, about 30 percent of these being "choice" students who live outside of the district's immediate boundaries (usually coming from elsewhere in El Paso or Teller counties). 

It has the highest graduation rate in the Pikes Peak Region.
The district has a 1-to-1 iPad Initiative for every student in grades five through twelve.

List of schools
 Manitou Springs Elementary School
 Ute Pass Elementary School (located in Chipita Park)
 Manitou Springs Middle School
Manitou Springs High School

See also
List of school districts in Colorado

References

External links

School districts in Colorado
Education in El Paso County, Colorado
Manitou Springs, Colorado